Walid Abdulmajid Abukhaled is the CEO of Saudi Arabian Military Industries (SAMI) and the former Chief Executive of global defense and aerospace corporation Northrop Grumman in the Middle East. He is a board member of Dussur.

Career
Abukhaled is from Saudi Arabia. He resides in Riyadh, Saudi Arabia. He holds a Bachelor's degree in industrial and management systems engineering from the University of South Florida.

He is the Board Director of DUSSUR Company, the Vice Chairman of the Board Northrop Grumman Mission Systems Arabia, and a member of Northrop Grumman Council for Diversity & Inclusion.

Awards

 Arabian Business Achievement KSA Awards - 2015 
 Entrepreneur of the year award “ Enterprise Agility – Thought Leadership 2018” Entrepreneur Middle East

References 

Saudi Arabian chief executives
1966 births
Living people
University of South Florida alumni